On April 12, 2018, Steven Walter Pladl, a 43-year old man from Knightdale, North Carolina, murdered his biological daughter, 20-year old Katie Rose Fusco Pladl, whom he had been incestuously abusing, and her adoptive father, 56-year old Anthony Charles Fusco, in New Milford, Connecticut. He later committed suicide in Dover, New York. He had murdered his and Katie's seven-month-old child, Bennett Kieron Pladl, the day prior in Knightdale.

Background 
In 1995, then-20-year old Steven Pladl met and groomed then-15-year old Alyssa over the internet. He traveled to San Antonio, Texas to begin a sexual relationship with her, and Alyssa ran away with Steven to live with him in New York. Alyssa became pregnant at 16 and gave birth to their first child at 17, whom they named Denise Pladl. According to Alyssa, Steven inflicted torturous abuse upon Denise by pinching her, beating her until she was "black and blue", and drowning her. Alyssa decided to put Denise up for adoption, because she believed Denise would not have a chance at life while living with Steven.

Adoption and reuniting with biological parents 
Anthony and Kelly Fusco adopted Denise and renamed her Katie Rose Fusco. In August 2016, when Katie was 18, she reached out to her biological parents, Steven and Alyssa Pladl, on Facebook, and they met in Knightdale, North Carolina. Katie decided to move in with Steven, Alyssa, and their other two children, a decision which her adoptive parents were apprehensive about, but supported her. By the time Katie moved in, Steven and Alyssa had made the decision to separate and were sleeping in separate bedrooms. Over the following months, Steven and Katie became incredibly close, and when confronted by Alyssa, Steven told her it was not her business and stormed out of the house with Katie. Alyssa moved out in November 2016 and she and Steven shared custody of the other two children.

Incest and criminal charges 
In May 2017, Alyssa read in one of their children's journals that Steven was involved in sexual activity with Katie, that Katie was pregnant, and that the two children had been told that Katie was their stepmother. Alyssa called Steven, who confirmed the incestuous abuse and that Katie was pregnant. Alyssa then called police.

On July 20, 2017, Steven and Katie got married in Parkton, Maryland, lying on their marriage documents that they were not related. The wedding was attended by Steven's mother and Katie's adoptive parents. Katie gave birth to a baby fathered by Steven, Bennett Kieron Pladl, in September 2017. In January 2018, Katie and Steven were arrested for incest charges. Steven's attorney maintained that his client's relationship with Katie was consensual and asserted that Steven had been "head over heels in love" with his daughter and that this had "outweighed the issue of them being biologically related", citing Steven's marital troubles as a factor. Following the killings, the attorney stated that "nobody ever could have predicted" Steven's actions, and that during their meetings, he showed "no indication" of possibly turning to violence. The judge ordered that Steven and Katie do not contact each other, while the custody of Bennett would be granted to Steven's mother.

Following their release on bond, Katie moved back with her adoptive parents and informed Steven over the phone that she did not want to continue their relationship.

Murders and suicide 
On April 11, 2018, Steven murdered his seven-month-old child Bennett at his home. Bennett is believed to have died by suffocation.

The next day, Katie and Anthony Fusco traveled from Dover, New York to Waterbury, Connecticut to visit Katie's grandmother. Knowing this was a routine for her, Steven traveled to Dover and followed Katie and Anthony's car, and murdered them with his Aero assault-type rifle, a firearm similar to an AR-15, on their route in New Milford, Connecticut. He then called his mother and told her that he had murdered Katie, Anthony, and Bennett. He later committed suicide via a self-inflicted gunshot wound in Dover, New York. His mother called police, who found Bennett dead in Steven's home. Bystanders reported shots being fired in New Milford, and police discovered Katie and Anthony's bodies in their car. The three victims were buried in Saint Charles Cemetery, Dover Plains, New York.

References 

2018 in North Carolina
2018 in Connecticut
2018 in New York (state)
2018 murders in the United States
April 2018 crimes in the United States
April 2018 events in the United States
Incestual abuse
Familicides
Incidents of violence against boys
Incidents of violence against women
Violence against children
Murder in Connecticut
Murder in North Carolina
Murder–suicides in Connecticut
Infanticide